Elling is a Norwegian Black comedy film directed by Petter Næss. Shot mostly in and around the Norwegian capital Oslo, the film, which was released in 2001, is primarily  based on Ingvar Ambjørnsen's novel Brødre i blodet ("Blood brothers", 1996), one of a series of four featuring the Elling character – the others are Utsikt til paradiset ("A view of paradise", 1993), Fugledansen ("The bird dance", 1995), and Elsk meg i morgen ("Love me tomorrow", 1999). The film was followed by an original prequel not based on any of the novels, Mors Elling (2003), and a sequel, Elsk meg i morgen (2005) based on the fourth and last book in the series.

Plot
The movie deals with the main character, Elling, a man with generalized anxiety in his 40s, and his struggle to function normally in society. He suffers from anxiety, dizziness, and neurotic tendencies, preventing him from living on his own. Elling has lived with his mother for his entire life, and when his mother dies, the authorities take him from the house where he has always lived and send him to an institution. His roommate is the simpleminded, sex-obsessed Kjell Bjarne. The Norwegian government pays for the two to move into an apartment in Oslo, where every day is a challenge as they must prove they can get out into the real world and lead relatively normal lives. With the help of social worker Frank and a few new friends, they learn to break free from their respective conditions. Elling eventually discovers a new vocation as a rebel poet, as Kjell befriends a pregnant woman with a drink problem which finally becomes a romance. The film ends with both men as firm friends, embarking on new lives filled with hope.

Cast
Elling — (Per Christian Ellefsen)
Kjell Bjarne — (Sven Nordin)
Reidun Nordsletten — (Marit Pia Jacobsen)
Frank Åsli — (Jørgen Langhelle)
Alfons Jørgensen — (Per Christensen)
Gunn — (Hilde Olausson)
Hauger — (Ola Otnes)
Johanne — (Eli Anne Linnestad)
Cecilie Kornes — (Cecilie A. Mosli)
Haakon Willum — (Joachim Rafaelsen)
Eriksen — (Per Gørvell)
Servitør på bar — (Knud Dahl)
Stasjonsbetjent — (Knut Haugmark)

Reception

Critical response
Elling has an approval rating of 85% on review aggregator website Rotten Tomatoes, based on 59 reviews, and an average rating of 7.10/10. The website's critical consensus states: "Quirky without being overly cutesy, Elling is a gentle, warm comedy". Metacritic assigned the film a weighted average score of 70 out of 100, based on 21 critics, indicating "generally favorable reviews".

Box office
It was the most popular Norwegian film of the year with admissions of 750,000.

Awards
Academy Awards: Best Foreign Language Film — Nominated (2002)
Amanda Awards (Norway): Best Actor (Per Christian Ellefsen) — Nominated (2001)

In addition, the film was nominated and won several other awards all over the world.

References

External links

 
 
 
 

2001 films
2000s Norwegian-language films
2001 comedy-drama films
Films based on Norwegian novels
Films directed by Petter Næss
Films set in Norway
Films shot in Norway
2001 in Norwegian cinema
2001 comedy films
2001 drama films
Norwegian comedy-drama films